"One Man Army" (often mistakenly called "Falling") is a song by Canadian alternative rock group Our Lady Peace. It was released in July 1999 as the lead single from their third album, Happiness...Is Not a Fish That You Can Catch.

Content
Raine Maida stated that the song is about "the struggle for individuality. It's about finding the courage to metaphorically strip naked and set fire to all your inhibitions. It's about cleansing yourself of all the people and things that suffocate your individuality."

Release
The release of the live version of "One Man Army" from their Woodstock 1999 performance forced the record label to release the single several weeks earlier than the planned date of August 4.

Track listing

US Pro CD

Columbia CSK 42454
 "One Man Army" (album version) – 3:22

UK 7"

Epic 668866 7
 "One Man Army" - 3:22
 "Superman's Dead" (live in NY)

UK Pro CD

Epic XPCD2440
 "One Man Army" (edit) – 3:08
 "One Man Army" (album version) – 3:22

UK Ltd. Ed. CD

SBME Import
 "One Man Army"
 "Starseed"
 "Clumsy"
 "One Man Army" (video)

Music video

This music video was directed by Mark Kohr and was filmed in Toronto on August 5, 1999. It begins with lead singer Raine Maida sitting in a chair in what appears to be a hotel hallway. Using special effects, he stands up and walks away, but a second "copy" of him remains seated. The video is then split into two sets of scenes: In one set, the band is set up in the middle of a lobby and performs the song; in the other scenes, Maida walks through a city. During the choruses of the song, Maida is suddenly pulled through the air (apparently acting as gravity was pulling him), causing him to crash into several walls, and smash through a tree, a wall, and several windows. He tries holding onto a fire hydrant and a street sign, but is pulled away. At the end of the video, Raine sits down on a bench on a pier,  but he is pulled away out over the water after trying to hold on to the bench.
In 2000, the video won another two MuchMusic Video Awards (both are People's Choice), Favourite Canadian Group and Favourite Canadian Video.

Charts

References

External links

1999 singles
Our Lady Peace songs
Songs written by Raine Maida
1999 songs
Songs written by Arnold Lanni
Epic Records singles